Dagmara Levanovna Slianova-Mizandari (December 1910 - 1983) was a composer born in the Republic of Georgia. Slianova-Mizandari studied at the Tbilisi State Conservatoire. She graduated in 1933, received a diploma in composition in 1935, and taught there until 1938. Her teachers included Boris Arapov, Mikhail Bagrinovsky, Pyotr Ryazanov, Ana Tulashvili, and Iona Tuskiya. 

Slianova-Mizandari’s works were published by Tbilisi: Education and Tbilisi: Georgian Branch of the Music Foundation of the USSR. They are archived at the National Parliamentary Library of Georgia. Her works include:

Chamber 

Pages of the Album (clarinet and piano) 

Quintet
Romance (cello and piano)

Pedagogy 

A Collection of Musical Dictations
Solfeggio

Piano 

Five Pieces for Children
Preludes Six Pieces for ChildrenTwo Plays for Piano''

References 

Soviet women composers
1910 births
1983 deaths
People from Georgia (country)
Music educators